The Broad Wall ( HaChoma HaRechava) is an ancient defensive wall, located in the Jewish Quarter of Jerusalem's Old City. The wall was unearthed in the 1970s by Israeli archaeologist Nahman Avigad and dated to the reign of King Hezekiah (late eighth century BCE).

The Broad Wall is a massive defensive structure, seven meters thick.

It was long believed that the city in this period was confined to the fortified, narrow hill running to the south of the Temple Mount known as the City of David. Avigad's dig demonstrated that by the late eighth century the city had expanded to include the hill to the west of the Temple Mount. The motivation for building the walls is believed to be Sennacherib's campaign in Judah.

See also 
Archaeology of Israel
Israelite Tower
Walls of Jerusalem

References

External links 

Buildings and structures completed in the 8th century BC
Ancient sites in Jerusalem
Jerusalem
Hezekiah
Jewish Quarter (Jerusalem)